Mantoida nitida is a species of praying mantis in the family Mantoididae. It is found in Mexico.

See also
List of mantis genera and species

References

N
Mantodea of North America
Insects of Mexico
Insects described in 1838